is a 1989 Nintendo Family Computer video game that was released exclusively in Japan.

Plot
The player-controlled character Roberto is staying in Las Vegas with his girlfriend Marian in a motel room on a romantic vacation. He is summoned to the motel clerk to pay his hotel bill only to discover that Marian was apparently kidnapped by a mysterious person under the employment of Akiko.

He must then solve the mystery. Roberto must be able to pay the $800,000 in ransom money for the location of his girlfriend to be revealed. Key people show up in the adventure component of the game and give out advice whenever he makes a notable amount of money at blackjack. The first informant shows up after increasing Roberto's bankroll to $5,000 and the final informant appears once Roberto has $100,000 in his pocketbook.

Gameplay

The player can either choose to solve the mystery or go straight to the gambling games of blackjack, slot machines, and roulette instead. Most of the adventure component of the game is to find Marian's kidnapper and apprehend him. Key aspects of the game include searching everywhere, playing some gambling games to improve the financial situation, and grabbing clues in order to solve the mystery. Ultimately, Marian tells the player to give up gambling. Otherwise, she dumps Roberto even after he rescued her.

A female dealer officiates the table games. All the options are clearly in English, while dialogue is in Japanese. Up to $10,000,000 can be earned in the game. If the player runs out of money, the game instantly ends.

References

External links
 Closing credits for Vegas Connection: Casino Kara Ai wo Komete
 Adveristing for Vegas Connection: Casino Kara Ai wo Komete at the Game Advertising Museum 

1989 video games
Digital card games
Japan-exclusive video games
Nintendo Entertainment System games
Nintendo Entertainment System-only games
Point-and-click adventure games
Sigma games
Video games developed in Japan
Video games set in the Las Vegas Valley
Video games set in Nevada